Sir Lewis Morris (23 January 1833 – 12 November 1907) was a Welsh academic and politician. He was also a popular poet of the Anglo-Welsh school.

Background
Born in Carmarthen, Carmarthenshire in south-west Wales to Lewis Edward William Morris and Sophia Hughes, he first attended Queen Elizabeth's Grammar School there (1841–47).Then in 1847 he transferred to Cowbridge Grammar School on the appointment to it of the energetically reviving and academically gifted young headmaster, Hugo Harper. There "he gave promise of his future classical scholarship by writing a prize poem on Pompeii". In 1850 he was one of about thirty Cowbridge boys who followed Harper to Sherborne whither the latter was bound on a similar mission of resuscitating a moribund school. Such "swarming" in the wake of a charismatic headmaster was typical of the period. Morris and Harper remained lifelong friends. He studied classics at Jesus College, Oxford, graduating in 1856: the first student in thirty years to obtain first-class honours in both his preliminary and his final examinations. In 1868 he married Florence Pollard.

Career
He then became a lawyer. He was Liberal candidate for Pembroke Boroughs in 1886 but lost to his Conservative opponent. He was Liberal candidate for Carmarthen Boroughs in 1892 but retired before the poll. He was knighted by Queen Victoria in 1895, and narrowly missed being appointed Poet Laureate, possibly because of his association with Oscar Wilde.  One of his most famous poems is "Love's Suicide".

He is buried at the parish church of Saint Cynnwr in Llangunnor.

Principal works 
Songs of Two Worlds 1875
The Epic of Hades 1877
Gwen: A Drama in Monologue Six Acts 1879
The Ode of Life 1880
Poetical Works 1882
Songs Unsung 1883
Gycia: A Tragedy in Five Acts 1886
Songs of Britain 1887
Selections from the Works of Sir Lewis Morris 1897
Harvest Tide: A Book of Verse 1900
The New Rambler from Desk to Platform 1905

References

Worldcat.org. Retrieved 3 May 2008
Chisholm, Hugh. "Morris, Sir Lewis." The Encyclopædia Britannica: A Dictionary of Arts, Sciences, Literature and General information. (11 ed.) Vol. XVIII The Encyclopædia Britannica Company, New York, 1911.  (pp. 870–871) googlebooks. Retrieved 3 May 2008

External links 

 
 
 

1833 births
1907 deaths
Alumni of Jesus College, Oxford
People from Carmarthen
Welsh poets
People educated at Sherborne School
People educated at Cowbridge Grammar School
19th-century poets
Members of Carmarthenshire County Council
Knights Bachelor